In computer programming, a programming idiom or code idiom is a group of code fragments sharing an equivalent semantic role, which recurs frequently across software projects often expressing a special feature of a recurring construct in one or more programming languages or libraries. This definition is rooted in the definition of "idiom" as used in the field of linguistics. Developers recognize programming idioms by associating and giving meaning (semantic role) to one or more syntactical expressions within code snippets (code fragments). The idiom can be seen as an action on a programming concept underlying a pattern in code, which is represented in implementation by contiguous or scattered code fragments. These fragments are available in several programming languages, frameworks or even libraries. Generally speaking, a programming idiom's semantic role is a natural language expression of a simple task, algorithm, or data structure that is not a built-in feature in the programming language being used, or, conversely, the use of an unusual or notable feature that is built into a programming language.

Knowing the idioms associated with a programming language and how to use them is an important part of gaining fluency in that language. It also helps to transfer knowledge in the form of analogies from one language or framework to another. Such idiomatic knowledge is widely used in crowdsourced repositories to help developers overcome programming barriers. Mapping code idioms to idiosyncrasies can be a helpful way to navigate the tradeoffs between generalization and specificity. By identifying common patterns and idioms, developers can create mental models and schemata that help them quickly understand and navigate new code. Furthermore, by mapping these idioms to idiosyncrasies and specific use cases, developers can ensure that they are applying the correct approach and not overgeneralizing it. 
One way to do this is by creating a reference or documentation that maps common idioms to specific use cases, highlighting where they may need to be adapted or modified to fit a particular project or development team. This can help ensure that developers are working with a shared understanding of best practices and can make informed decisions about when to use established idioms and when to adapt them to fit their specific needs.

A common misconception is to use the adverbial or adjectival form of the term as using a programming language in a typical way, which really refers to a idiosyncrasy. An idiom implies the semantics of some code in a programming language has similarities to other languages or frameworks. For example, an idiosyncratic way to manage dynamic memory in C would be to use the C standard library functions malloc and free, whereas idiomatic refers to manual memory management as recurring semantic role that can be achieved with code fragments malloc in C, or pointer = new type [number_of_elements] in C++. In both cases, the semantics of the code are intelligible to developers familiar with C or C++, once the idiomatic or idiosyncratic rationale is exposed to them. However, while idiomatic rationale is often general to the programming domain, idiosyncratic rationale is frequently tied to specific API terminology.

Examples of simple idioms

Printing Hello World

One of the most common starting points to learn to program or notice the syntax differences between a known language and a new one.

It has several implementations, among them the code fragments for C++:
std::cout << "Hello World\n";

For Java:
System.out.println("Hello World");

Inserting an element in an array
This idiom helps developers understand how to manipulate collections in a given language, particularly inserting an element x at a position i in a list s and moving the elements to its right.

Code fragments:

For Python:
s.insert(i, x) 

For JavaScript:
s.splice(i, 0, x); 

For Perl:
splice(@s, $i, 0, $x)

See also 
 Algorithmic skeleton
 Embedded SQL
 Idiom

References

External links 
 programming-idioms.org shows short idioms implementations in most mainstream languages.
 C++ programming idioms from Wikibooks.